The Romanian Ministry of Foreign Affairs is the ministry responsible for external affairs of the Romanian Government. The current Foreign Minister is Bogdan Aurescu.

List of Ministers of Foreign Affairs (1862–1989)

List of Ministers of Foreign Affairs (1989–present)

Notes
Romania used the Julian calendar until 1919, but all dates are given in the Gregorian calendar.

The following party abbreviations are used:

Additionally, the political stance of prime ministers prior to the development of a modern party system is given by C (Conservative), MC (Moderate Conservative), RL (Radical Liberal) and ML (Moderate Liberal). Interim officeholders are denoted by italics. For those who held office multiple times, their rank of service is given by a Roman numeral.

References

External links
 MAE.ro
 GUV.ro

 
Foreign affairs
Foreign relations of Romania
Romania
 
Romanian
Foreign Ministers
Ministries established in 1862
1862 establishments in Romania